The 2011 Brabantse Pijl was the 51st edition of the Brabantse Pijl cycle race and was held on 13 April 2011. The race started in Leuven and finished in Overijse. The race was won by Philippe Gilbert.

General classification

References

2011
Brabantse Pijl